Chocolate marquise is a rich chocolate dessert made with dark chocolate, butter, sugar, cocoa powder, eggs and cream. It may be flavored with vanilla and espresso.

See also
 List of desserts

References

Chocolate desserts